A fricative is a consonant produced by forcing air through a narrow channel made by placing two articulators close together. This turbulent airflow is called frication. 

A particular subset of fricatives are the sibilants. When forming a sibilant, one still is forcing air through a narrow channel, but in addition, the tongue is curled lengthwise to direct the air over the edge of the teeth.

The usage of two other terms is less standardized: "Spirant" is an older term for fricatives used by some American and European phoneticians and phonologists. "Strident" could mean just "sibilant", but some authors include also labiodental and uvular fricatives in the class.

Types
The airflow is not completely stopped in the production of fricative consonants. In other words, the airflow experiences friction.

Sibilants
  voiceless coronal sibilant, as in English sip
  voiced coronal sibilant, as in English zip
  voiceless dental sibilant
  voiced dental sibilant
  voiceless apical sibilant
  voiced apical sibilant
  voiceless predorsal sibilant (laminal, with tongue tip at lower teeth)
  voiced predorsal sibilant (laminal)
  voiceless postalveolar sibilant (laminal)
  voiced postalveolar sibilant (laminal)
  voiceless palato-alveolar sibilant (domed, partially palatalized), as in English ship
  voiced palato-alveolar sibilant (domed, partially palatalized), as the si in English vision
  voiceless alveolo-palatal sibilant (laminal, palatalized)
  voiced alveolo-palatal sibilant (laminal, palatalized)
  voiceless retroflex sibilant (apical or subapical)
  voiced retroflex sibilant (apical or subapical)

All sibilants are coronal, but may be dental, alveolar, postalveolar, or palatal (retroflex) within that range. However, at the postalveolar place of articulation, the tongue may take several shapes: domed, laminal, or apical, and each of these is given a separate symbol and a separate name. Prototypical retroflexes are subapical and palatal, but they are usually written with the same symbol as the apical postalveolars. The alveolars and dentals may also be either apical or laminal, but this difference is indicated with diacritics rather than with separate symbols.

Central non-sibilant fricatives
  voiceless bilabial fricative
  voiced bilabial fricative
  voiceless labiodental fricative, as in English fine
  voiced labiodental fricative, as in English vine
  voiceless linguolabial fricative
  voiced linguolabial fricative
  voiceless dental non-sibilant fricative, as in English thing
  voiced dental non-sibilant fricative, as in English that
  voiceless alveolar non-sibilant fricative
  voiced alveolar non-sibilant fricative
  voiceless trilled fricative
  voiced trilled fricative
  voiceless palatal fricative
  voiced palatal fricative
  voiceless velar fricative
  voiced velar fricative
  voiceless palatal-velar fricative (articulation disputed)

The IPA also has letters for epiglottal fricatives,
  voiceless epiglottal fricative
  voiced epiglottal fricative
with allophonic trilling, but these might be better analyzed as pharyngeal trills.

  voiceless velopharyngeal fricative (often occurs with a cleft palate)
  voiced velopharyngeal fricative

Lateral fricatives
  voiceless dental lateral fricative
  voiced dental lateral fricative
  voiceless alveolar lateral fricative
  voiced alveolar lateral fricative
  voiceless postalveolar lateral fricative (Mehri)
  voiced postalveolar lateral fricative
  or extIPA  voiceless retroflex lateral fricative
  or extIPA  Voiced retroflex lateral fricative (in Ao)
  or extIPA  voiced palatal lateral fricative (allophonic in Jebero)
  or extIPA  voiceless velar lateral fricative 
  or extIPA  voiced velar lateral fricative

The lateral fricative occurs as the ll of Welsh, as in Lloyd, Llewelyn, and Machynlleth (a town), as the unvoiced 'hl' and voiced 'dl' or 'dhl' in the several languages of Southern Africa  (such as Xhosa and Zulu), and in Mongolian.

IPA letters used for both fricatives and approximants
  voiceless uvular fricative
  voiced uvular fricative
  voiceless pharyngeal fricative
  voiced pharyngeal fricative

No language distinguishes fricatives from approximants at these places, so the same symbol is used for both. For the pharyngeal, approximants are more numerous than fricatives. A fricative realization may be specified by adding the uptack to the letters, . Likewise, the downtack may be added to specify an approximant realization, .

(The bilabial approximant and dental approximant do not have dedicated symbols either and are transcribed in a similar fashion: . However, the base letters are understood to specifically refer to the fricatives.)

Pseudo-fricatives

  voiceless glottal transition, as in English hat
  breathy-voiced glottal transition

In many languages, such as English, the glottal "fricatives" are unaccompanied phonation states of the glottis, without any accompanying manner, fricative or otherwise. However, in languages such as Arabic, they are true fricatives.

In addition,  is usually called a "voiceless labial-velar fricative", but it is actually an approximant. True doubly articulated fricatives may not occur in any language; but see voiceless palatal-velar fricative for a putative (and rather controversial) example.

Aspirated fricatives
Fricatives are very commonly voiced, though cross-linguistically voiced fricatives are not nearly as common as tenuis ("plain") fricatives. Other phonations are common in languages that have those phonations in their stop consonants. However, phonemically aspirated fricatives are rare.   contrasts with a tense, unaspirated  in Korean; aspirated fricatives are also found in a few Sino-Tibetan languages, in some Oto-Manguean languages, in the Siouan language Ofo ( and ), and in the (central?) Chumash languages ( and ).

Nasalized fricatives
Phonemically nasalized fricatives are rare. Umbundu has  and Kwangali and Souletin Basque have . In Coatzospan Mixtec,  appear allophonically before a nasal vowel, and in Igbo nasality is a feature of the syllable; when  occur in nasal syllables they are themselves nasalized.

Occurrence
Until its extinction, Ubykh may have been the language with the most fricatives (29 not including ), some of which did not have dedicated symbols or diacritics in the IPA. This number actually outstrips the number of all consonants in English (which has 24 consonants). By contrast, approximately 8.7% of the world's languages have no phonemic fricatives at all. This is a typical feature of Australian Aboriginal languages, where the few fricatives that exist result from changes to plosives or approximants, but also occurs in some indigenous languages of New Guinea and South America that have especially small numbers of consonants. However, whereas  is entirely unknown in indigenous Australian languages, most of the other languages without true fricatives do have  in their consonant inventory.

Voicing contrasts in fricatives are largely confined to Europe, Africa, and Western Asia. These voiced fricatives are also relatively rare in indigenous languages of the Americas. Overall, voicing contrasts in fricatives are much rarer than in plosives, being found only in about a third of the world's languages as compared to 60 percent for plosive voicing contrasts.

About 15 percent of the world's languages, however, have unpaired voiced fricatives, i.e. a voiced fricative without a voiceless counterpart. Two-thirds of these, or 10 percent of all languages, have unpaired voiced fricatives but no voicing contrast between any fricative pair.

This phenomenon occurs because voiced fricatives have developed from lenition of plosives or fortition of approximants. This phenomenon of unpaired voiced fricatives is scattered throughout the world, but is confined to nonsibilant fricatives with the exception of a couple of languages that have  but lack . (Relatedly, several languages have the voiced affricate  but lack , and vice versa.)

Acoustics
Fricatives appear in waveforms as somewhat random noise caused by the turbulent airflow, upon which a periodic pattern is overlaid if voiced. Fricatives produced in the front of the mouth tend to have energy concentration at higher frequencies than ones produced in the back. The centre of gravity (CoG), i.e. the average frequency in a spectrum weighted by the amplitude (also known as spectral mean), may be used to determine the place of articulation of a fricative relative to that of another.

See also
 Apical consonant
 Hush consonant
 Laminal consonant
 List of phonetics topics

Notes

References

External links 
 Fricatives in English

Manner of articulation